Bagir Mirgasim Seyidzade (1912 – 1968) was an acclaimed Azerbaijani public figure, diplomat, journalist, honorary culture worker of the Azerbaijani SSR.

Baqir had a son, Fuad Seyidzadeh ( Azerbaijani: Fuad Seyidzadə, Russian: Фуад Сейидзаде ) and a daughter, Dilara Seyidzadeh (Azerbaijani: Dilarə Seyidzadə, Russian: Дилара Сеидзаде )

Biography

In 1925, Bagir Seyidzade came to Baku. He got a job at Taghiyev`s plant, which was later renamed after Lenin. After a while he entered the working faculty, which he graduated from in 1930. For a couple of months, Bagir Seyidzade worked as a proofreader at Kandli newspaper. He then graduated from the faculty of oil technology of the Azerbaijani Industrial Institute.

In 1932-1940, he worked as the secretary and editor at Ganj ishi (Youth affairs) newspaper.

In 1940-1943, he was the secretary of the Central Committee of the Leninist Young Communist League of the Azerbaijani SSR.

After completing diplomatic courses in Moscow, Bagir Seyidzade was sent to Iran where he started his diplomatic career. In 1944-1949, he was the consul, vice consul and chief consul in Maku and Tabriz. Bagir Seyidzade played an important role in establishing the government in Southern Azerbaijan, for which he was awarded "21 Azer" medal by the national government.

After returning from Iran he was appointed the minister of cinematography of the Azerbaijani SSR. He created the press department, which he later headed. The department merged with the ministry of culture of the Azerbaijani SSR, and Bagir Seyidzade was appointed the deputy minister of culture.

He was also involved in journalism and translation. He translated several parts of «Жизнь замечательных людей» (The life of remarkable people) series into Azerbaijani. Bagir Seyidzade is considered one of the founders of the Azerbaijani school of translation.
He was the deputy Director General of Azerinform (AzerTAc).

Bagir Seyidzade died of an extensive heart attack. He was buried at the Alley of Honors in Baku.

References

External links
 "Bağır Seyidzadə 100" miniatür kitabı çapdan çıxıb

1912 births
1968 deaths
Soviet diplomats
Azerbaijani communists
Azerbaijani cinematographers
Azerbaijani journalists
Translators to Azerbaijani
Soviet Azerbaijani people
Soviet journalists
Soviet cinematographers